Karpuzlu is a village in the Kozluk District of Batman Province in Turkey. The village is populated by Kurds of the Bekiran and Reşkotan tribes and had a population of 135 in 2021.

The hamlets of Kaynarca and Üçyol are attached to the village.

References 

Villages in Kozluk District
Kurdish settlements in Batman Province